The Men's time trial at the 2013 UCI Track Cycling World Championships was held on February 20. 19 athletes participated in the contest.

Medalists

Results
The race was held at 19:15.

References

2013 UCI Track Cycling World Championships
UCI Track Cycling World Championships – Men's 1 km time trial